Carl Schiøtz (2 November 1877 – 20 September 1938) was a Norwegian physician and professor of hygiene and bacteriology at the University of Oslo.

Biography
He was born in Hamar, Norway. His parents were   Jonas Schanche Kielland Schiøtz (1841-1901) and his wife Hanna Minda Constance Øvergaard.
His brother was military officer Johannes Henrik Schiøtz (1884-1957).  In 1906, he was married to  Borghild Hannestad (1882-1952). After graduating in 1896 from Hamar Cathedral School, he became a cand.med. in 1904 at the University of Kristiana 
From 1907 to 1914 he worked at Nes in Ringsaker. He  moved to Kristiania (now Oslo) to work at the Rikshospitalet as a reserve doctor,   university fellow and health inspector. In 1916, he became a  doctor at the Freia Chocolate Factory. In 1918 he became Dr. med. with his dissertation on  school children's weight ratios.
 
Schiøtz conducted a number of comprehensive and significant studies on the schoolchildren's health and did much for the development of school hygiene. He is most known for composing what became known as the  "Oslo breakfast", served at all primary schools in Oslo. Oslofrokosten was introduced in school years 1929-1930 at some schools and in 1932 it was introduced at all Oslo schools.
He was a professor of hygiene and bacteriology at the University of Oslo from 1931, a position he had until his death in 1938. 
He was editor of the Journal of the Norwegian Medical Association from 1929, editor of Sundhetsbladet from  1927–34 and founding editor of the magazine Liv og hälhed from 1934.

From 1935 he was elected to membership in the Norwegian Academy of Science and Letters. He became a knight of the Order of the Dannebrog,  Swedish Order of the Polar Star and commander of the Order of the White Rose of Finland.

Selected works
En undersøkelse av 10 000 norske skolebarn, særlig med hensyn til vekstforhold (1917, thesis)

References

External links
Schiøtz medalje for hygienisk forskning (University of Oslo)
From poor law society to the welfare state: school meals in Norway 1890s–1950s (University of Bergen)

1877 births
1938 deaths
People from Hamar
University of Oslo alumni
Oslo University Hospital people
Norwegian bacteriologists
Knights of the Order of the Dannebrog
Knights of the Order of the Polar Star
Members of the Norwegian Academy of Science and Letters